Spelaeornis, the typical wren-babblers, is a bird genus in the family Timaliidae. Among this group, the typical wren-babblers are quite closely related to the type species, the chestnut-capped babbler (Timalia pileata). One species that was earlier placed in the genus, the spotted elachura has been removed to a genus of its own Elachura and placed in a separate family.

Species
It contains the following species:

References

 Collar, N. J. & Robson, C. 2007. Family Timaliidae (Babblers)  pp. 70 – 291 in; del Hoyo, J., Elliott, A. & Christie, D.A. eds. Handbook of the Birds of the World, Vol. 12. Picathartes to Tits and Chickadees. Lynx Edicions, Barcelona.

External links
 
 

 
Timaliidae
Old World babblers
Bird genera
Taxa named by Armand David
Taxa named by Émile Oustalet
Taxonomy articles created by Polbot